Dutch Hill may refer to:

 Dutch Hill, California, a former settlement in Plumas County
 Dutch Hill/Cohocton Wind Farm, a wind farm in Cohocton, New York
 Dutch Hill (Delaware County, New York), a mountain
 Dutch Hill (Herkimer County, New York), a mountain